Eli Iserbyt (born 22 October 1997) is a Belgian cyclo-cross and road cyclist, who currently rides for UCI Continental team . As a junior, he won the silver medal at the 2015 UCI Cyclo-cross World Championships. He won the gold medal in the men's under-23 event at the 2016 UCI Cyclo-cross World Championships  in Heusden-Zolder and took another gold in the under-23 race at the 2017 UEC European Cyclo-cross Championships in Tábor. In 2018 he won another gold medal in the men's under-23 event at the World Championships in Valkenburg.

Major results

Road
2015
 4th Overall Sint-Martinusprijs Kontich
1st  Mountains classification
2018
 3rd Overall Boucles de la Mayenne
1st  Young rider classification
 10th Overall Flèche du Sud

Cyclo-cross

2013–2014
 1st  National Junior Championships
 Junior BPost Bank Trophy
1st Ronse
 Junior Superprestige
2nd Diegem
2nd Middelkerke
 UCI Junior World Cup
2nd Tábor
3rd Rome
2014–2015
 1st  UEC European Junior Championships
 1st  National Junior Championships
 1st  Overall UCI Junior World Cup
1st Cauberg
1st Heusden-Zolder
1st Hoogerheide
2nd Namur
 1st Overall Junior Superprestige
1st Gieten
1st Zonhoven
1st Ruddervoorde
1st Gavere
1st Spa-Francorchamps
1st Diegem
1st Hoogstraten
2nd Middelkerke
 Junior BPost Bank Trophy
1st Ronse
3rd Lille
 Junior Soudal Classics
1st Leuven
 1st Junior Overijse
 1st Junior Oostmalle
 2nd  UCI World Junior Championships
2015–2016
 1st  UCI World Under-23 Championships
 1st  Overall UCI Under-23 World Cup
1st Koksijde
1st Namur
1st Lignières-en-Berry
2nd Cauberg
2nd Hoogerheide
 1st Overall Under-23 Superprestige
1st Zonhoven
1st Ruddervoorde
1st Gavere
1st Hoogstraten
1st Middelkerke
3rd Gieten
 Under-23 BPost Bank Trophy
1st Ronse
1st Hamme
 1st Under-23 Overijse
 3rd  UEC European Under-23 Championships
2016–2017
 UCI Under-23 World Cup
1st Rome
2nd Zeven
 2nd Overall Under-23 DVV Trophy
1st Koppenberg
1st Essen
1st Loenhout
1st Baal
2nd Ronse
2nd Hamme
2nd Antwerpen
3rd Lille
 Under-23 Superprestige
1st Gavere
2nd Ruddervoorde
2nd Hoogstraten
3rd Diegem
2017–2018
 1st  UCI World Under-23 Championships
 1st  UEC European Under-23 Championships
 2nd Overall UCI Under-23 World Cup
1st Zeven
1st Hoogerheide
2nd Bogense
2nd Namur
2nd Heusden-Zolder
3rd Koksijde
 1st Overall Under-23 DVV Trophy
1st Ronse
1st Hamme
1st Essen
1st Antwerpen
1st Loenhout
1st Baal
1st Lille
2nd Koppenberg
 Under-23 Superprestige
1st Hoogstraten
2nd Middelkerke
2018–2019
 2nd Overall UCI Under-23 World Cup
1st Bern
1st Heusden-Zolder
1st Hoogerheide
3rd Namur
 2nd  UCI World Under-23 Championships
 2nd  UEC European Under-23 Championships
 3rd Hasselt
 3rd Overall Under-23 Superprestige
2019–2020
 1st Overall DVV Trophy
1st Koppenberg
2nd Ronse
2nd Loenhout
2nd Baal
2nd Brussels
 2nd Overall UCI World Cup
1st Iowa City
1st Waterloo
1st Bern
1st Nommay
2nd Tábor
3rd Hoogerheide
 2nd Overall Superprestige
1st Gieten
1st Gavere
2nd Diegem
3rd Zonhoven
3rd Middelkerke
 Ethias Cross
1st Kruibeke
1st Maldegem
1st Hulst
2nd Eeklo
2nd Meulebeke
 2nd  UEC European Championships
 2nd National Championships
2020–2021
 1st  UEC European Championships
 1st Overall X²O Badkamers Trophy
1st Koppenberg
1st Kortrijk
2nd Antwerpen
 2nd Overall Superprestige
1st Ruddervoorde
1st Boom
2nd Gieten
2nd Niel
2nd Merksplas
3rd Middelkerke
 Ethias Cross
1st Lokeren
1st Sint-Niklaas
2nd Beringen
3rd Kruibeke
3rd Eeklo
 UCI World Cup
2nd Tábor
2021–2022
 1st  Overall UCI World Cup
1st Waterloo
1st Iowa City
1st Overijse
1st Koksijde
1st Besançon
1st Flamanville
1st Hoogerheide
2nd Fayetteville
2nd Tábor
2nd Rucphen
2nd Hulst
3rd Zonhoven
 1st Overall Superprestige
1st Ruddervoorde
1st Niel
1st Merksplas
2nd Gavere
3rd Gieten
3rd Heusden-Zolder
 2nd Overall X²O Badkamers Trophy
1st Koppenberg
2nd Kortrijk
2nd Brussels
3rd Baal
3rd Hamme
 Ethias Cross
1st Lokeren
1st Beringen
1st Bredene
2nd Maldegem
 3rd  UCI World Championships
2022–2023
 1st Overall X²O Badkamers Trophy
1st Baal
1st Brussels
2nd Koppenberg
2nd Hamme
3rd Kortrijk
3rd Herentals
3rd Lille
 2nd Overall Superprestige
1st Ruddervoorde
1st Middelkerke
2nd Gullegem
 3rd Overall UCI World Cup
1st Waterloo
1st Fayetteville
1st Tábor
3rd Maasmechelen
3rd Hulst
3rd Benidorm
 Exact Cross
1st Beringen
2nd Kruibeke
2nd Meulebeke
3rd Sint Niklaas
 3rd  UCI World Championships

UCI World Cup results

References

External links
 
 

1997 births
Living people
Cyclo-cross cyclists
Belgian male cyclists
Place of birth missing (living people)